, also written as Kamui Shirou, is a fictional character that was created by Clamp and introduced as the protagonist of the manga series X. Kamui is a young esper who returns to his home, Tokyo, after a six-year absence following his mother's last will. According to her, he can change the world's fate. He can either join the groups a Dragons of Heaven or Dragons of Earth and fight for mankind or the nature, respectively. Kamui has also appeared in the animated adaptations of X, in which  he follows a different course of action, and he also appears as an alternative persona from a post-apocalyptic Tokyo in the manga Tsubasa: Reservoir Chronicle.

Clamp's head writer Nanase Ohkawa originally created Kamui during high school as character in a story involving warriors fighting for justice. His incorporation to X includes themes Ohkawa thought about since she was a student, such a possibility of an evil alter ego and whether mankind is more important than the Earth. The animated versions of X portray Kamui as neither as a strong nor a weak character due to the staff's preference. The character has been played by voice actors in the animated series including the Japanese Tomokazu Seki (X film), Kenichi Suzumura (X TV series) and Mamoru Miyano (Tsubasa). His English actors are Alan D. Marriott (X film), Steve Cannon (X TV series) and Micah Solusod (Tsubasa).

Publications for manga, anime and other media gave a mixed response to Kamui. Writers often criticize him for his brooding personality, but his character development in the series made them appreciate his role in the story as well his tragic role in the narrative. Kamui has also been popular within Clamp's fanbase despite the authors often receiving negative feedback in the manga's beginning. Kamui's portrayal in Tsubasa also garnered mixed responses because he comes across as X fanservice though his encounters with the lead character Syaoran.

Creation and development

Kamui originates from a story Clamp's head writer Nanase Ohkawa wrote during high school. Kamui was one of the story's  lead characters, who were fighting a losing battle for "justice". After finishing Clamp School Detectives, Clamp decided to write a story in which readers see the development of two groups, the Dragons of Heavens and the Dragons of Earth led by Kamui and Fūma, respectively. Several of the series' characters were created using the Osamu Tezuka's Star System technique were old designs incorporated in new characters with Kamui's exception which proved challenging due to his role. He was made to stand apart from other characters, and Ohkawa called his hairstyle and school uniform average. Clamp's lead artist Mokona believes this was influenced by the heroic character-type upon which he was based. As a result, Mokona felt that Kamui's final design fits her idea of the hero needed for the series. Their first illustration of Kamui gave them a feeling of Ashura, a character from RG Veda based on his appearance in Tokyo's destroyed area.

The authors originally wanted to name the character from another character they created in series, but because the plot required him to have a meaningful name, the idea was scrapped and he was named "Kamui" (Japanese for "The One Who Represents God's will"). Kamui was originally written as a high-school student from Kotori Monou's point of view to appeal to the shōjo manga audience of female teenagers. Kamui, however, was not popular with the readers, so Clamp rewrote parts of his personality. Mokona describes him as a "crazy dog", but readers disliked Kotori more than they disliked Kamui. Clamp kept the identity of Kamui's father hidden from Kamui. The artists said should the series continue, further exposition of Kamui's heritage would be developed. 

Kamui's decisions reflects one of X main themes; caring for humans even if does not help the Earth. Ohkawa considers that while it common sense that people care about protecting the planet, it is more important to love friends and relatives. Ohkawa also applied to Kamui and Fūma ideas she had as a child, such as a dual nature, because she states people can be considered good or evil. As a result of Kamui losing Kotori and all of his relatives, Ohkawa  emphazed Kamui's friendship with Fūma because she believes his feelings have become stronger. Across the manga, Kamui meets Subaru Sumeragi, whose rivalry with Seishirō Sakurazuka parallels Kamui's rivalry with Fūma Monou. Clamp referred to Kamui and Subaru as siblings; Kamui is supposed to learn from Subaru's final fight with Seishirō and avoid his final fight against Fuuma having the same tragic conclusion.

Alternative portrayals
For the X television series, director Yoshiaki Kawajiri decided not to explore Kamui's backstory early in the series and to focus more on his cold demeanor. Kawajiri considered Kamui weak because of how much it costs him to express emotions. As a result, he portraying Kamui as a strong person, though his weakness becomes noticeable as the narrative progresses. He is voiced in the film by Tomokazu Seki in Japanese and Alan D. Marriott in English. Kamui is voiced in the television series by Kenichi Suzumura in Japanese and Steve Cannon in English.

Because Kamui did not have many lines in the original video animation, Suzumura lacked a full impression of him before more of his character was explored in the television series. Suzumura found his role complicated because he understands Kamui is neither the weakest nor the strongest character. Voicing Kamui meant Suzumura debuted as a singer for an X CD. In August 2011, Suzumura married singer and actor Maaya Sakamoto; as a gift, Clamp made an illustration of Kamui holding Tomoyo from Tsubasa: Reservoir Chronicle, since the latter is voiced by Sakamoto.

A common trope Clamp enjoys using is identical characters. When the manga Tsubasa: Reservoir Chronicle was made, Subaru was envisioned as Kamui's twin brother. Clamp had fun writing this version of these characters despite not being identical brothers. Subaru was intended to have a larger role in Tsubasa, mentoring the protagonist Syaoran, but he was replaced by Seishirō. As in the original Clamp works Tokyo Babylon and X, Subaru was chasing Seishirō; Clamp decided to reverse this for Tsubasa, making Seishirō the one chasing both brothers. In Tsubasa Tokyo Revelations OVAs, Kamui is voiced by Mamoru Miyano in Japanese and Micah Solusod in English.

Characterization and themes

Kamui is introduced in X as an antisocial teenager who often becomes distant with his childhood friends Kotori and Fuma. He is driven by the loss of his mother who taught his child about his importance in regards to the world's future. His given name implies the two possible natures he can give to the planet through his supernatural powers and hidden potential. Despite his mannerism, Kamui reveals his personality is a facade when Hinoto shows him the future death of Kotori as well as his relation with the end of the worl which heavily angers him. This later causes him to reflect on his actions and reveal his true self as he shows his real kind demeanor towards Kotori to protect her from Hinoto's vision. Following the death of his uncle, Kamui shows his true resolve in regards to the apocalypse; He is not interested in society or the planet's pollution but instead wants to his two childhood friends. This causes the transformation of Fuma into the opposite Kamui who kills Kotori to bring despair to his former friend.

Kotori's death causes a major impact into Kamui, but manages to recover thanks to one of the Dragons of Heavens Subaru Sumeragi who would become his mentor in the narrative. He accepts the path of the Dragons of Heavens as he expresses his love towards mankind. From this point on, Kamui becomes more concerned about his role in the Armageddon due to the lives his enemies might take in the process but is powerless against the sadistic Fuma. His weakness is further explored as, unlike the other Dragons of Heavens, Kamui is unable to create a magical barrier need to protect areas around Tokyo to protect.

Kamui is also established as a Christ figure. Kamui is prophesied to return to Tokyo as one who will determine humanity's fate. The construction of Kamui as a messiah is reinforced by his miraculous birth and given name; "Kamui", like "Christ", alludes to the character's divine nature. A common theme in X involves how the future is predetermined to every person with Kamui's exception as he can choose a group to join. While the movie forces Kamui do face his biggest fear and slay Fuma, the television series explore Kamui's free will and he can use it in the climax to solve the dilemma provided by the narrative.

Appearances

In the X manga
In X, Kamui is introduced as a teenager who returns to Tokyo after a six-year absence following his mother's death. Contrary to the kindheartedness with which his childhood friends Fūma and Kotori Monou remember him, Kamui appears distanced and cold, and avoids interacting with them. Following his arrival to Tokyo, Kamui is observed by two groups known as the Dragons of Heaven and the Dragons of Earth, who are interested in Kamui's ability to change the world's fate. Princess Hinoto contacts Kamui and warns him if he does not become the Dragons of Heaven's leader, Kotori will be murdered. Still confused about what he should do, Kamui meets his aunt Tokiko Magami, who sacrifices herself to create the weapon , which Kamui must wield to change Earth's fate.

After Tokiko's death, Kamui gains a full understanding about his mission. He can either become a Dragon of Heaven and protect mankind from extinction or he can become a Dragon of Earth and destroy mankind to protect the Earth. As a result of starting to care about Fūma and Kotori again, Kamui instantly becomes a Dragon of Heaven. Fūma awakens a sadistic alter-ego known as the Dragon of Earth's "Kamui". The new Fūma kills Kotori to torture Kamui but escapes after the arrival of the Dragons of Heaven. One of them, Subaru Sumeragi, helps Kamui recover from his traumatic experience by encouraging him to grant his own wish, which is recovering the original Fūma.

For the next month, Kamui starts living with the Dragons of Heaven Sorata Arisugawa, Arashi Kishū and Yuzuriha Nekoi, which helps him form new friendships while often meeting Subaru. He and the Dragons of Heaven work with Hinoto's assistance to protect Tokyo's barriers from the Dragons of Earth and avoid the Earth's destruction. Kamui encounters Fūma several times during his fights but is unable to defeat him. In the series' latest chapters before its indefinite hiatus, Kamui summons the Sacred Sword and again encounters Fūma alongside Subaru, who tells him he will never defeat Fūma unless he identifies his true wish.

In X adaptations and other series
While the manga's serialization was put in hiatus, leaving the story unconcluded, its animated adaptations show Kamui reaching different fates. In the X film (1996), Kamui refuses to side with the Dragon of Heavens until Fūma and Kotori are taken by Hinoto's sister Kanoe. The Dragons of Heavens continuously fight the Dragon of Earth, and both sides suffer casualties that result in the destruction of Tokyo. Fūma kills Kotori in front of Kamui to take the Sacred Sword from her. Kamui unseals the Sacred Sword his mother gave him and decapitates Fūma. As the match ends, Kamui—the sole survivor of the war— starts crying while holding Fūma's head. In the television series, Kamui goes to fight Fūma after Hinoto's suicide unseals the Sacred Sword. He tries to kill Fūma after learning his loss was predetermined. Kamui is severely wounded in combat and is saved by Subaru, who again encourages him to grant his own wish and Kamui faces Fūma. In the final battle, Kamui sacrifices his life to create a barrier that will protect mankind and passes Fūma his will, which restores his personality.

An alternative version of Kamui appears  as one of the vampire twins Seishirō is seeking in Clamp's crossover series Tsubasa: Reservoir Chronicle. Kamui leads the fighters of the City Hall faction (alternative versions of the Dragons of Earth) in a battle to protect their water source, although he is actually protecting his twin Subaru, who is sleeping underwater. Kamui often fights an alternative version of Fuma, who leads the Tokyo Tower faction. When encountering a dimension traveler called Syaoran, Subaru awakens after Syaoran retrieves a magical feather that sealed him. Before leaving Tokyo, Kamui gives his regenerative blood to the dying sorcerer Fai D. Flowright as part of a negotiation to restore Tokyo's water. Kamui and Subaru then leave Tokyo and reunite with Fuma in the epilogue. Outside manga and anime, Kamui also appears as a playable character in two video games based on the series; X: Unmei no Sentaku. He is also the subject of the seventh CD of the audio drama series X Character Files, in which Kenichi Suzumura provides his voice.

Reception

Kamui received multiple reactions from publications for manga and anime.  The New York Times praised his character design for how unique as Clamp's works alongside Hinoto. Mike Crandol from Anime News Network found Kamui less interesting than other supporting characters due to his negative attitude. Animefringe found the way Kamui's role in the story  changes his fate interesting and stated despite his strong personality, Kamui will still face catastrophes. Despite his dark personality, crItics said he becomes more likable as the narrative progresses. Matthew Warner from the Fandom Post states that while Kamui's antiheroic portrayal makes him look like a "prick", he becomes more appealing the move his backstory is displayed. Chris Beveridge from Mania Entertainment noted that Kamui's tragic backstory explored in the series "adds a new dimension" to the character. Zac Bertschy from Anime News Network agreed noting that Kamui managed to develop despite retaining his brooding and distanced persona. Two reviewers from THEM Anime Reviews shared similar comments as viewers would find him more relatable and mature. On the other hand, Andy Hanley from UK Anime Network found that despite the appealing backstory Kamui to understand his emotions, it still "doesn't make him any less frustrating to watch" when compared to other characters. For the film, Bamboo Dong from ANN praised Tomokazu Seki role voicing Kamui due to how he displays the character's emotions. In promoting the anime Karakuri Circus, producer Masao Maruyama also praised Seki's work as Kamui alongside Kōhei Kiyasu's from Hajime no Ippo for presenting a natural progression in their characters. On the other hand, Bertschy felt that Steve Cannon lacked the appeal of Kenichi Suzumura when portraying the lead of X.

Critics focused on the relationship between Kamui and Fūma, many considering it one of the strongest areas in Rintaro's 1996 film, with Kamui's trauma over killing his friend, giving the narrative a bigger apocalypstic feel than the television series. In another retrospective review of the anime X, Beverdige—now writing for Fandom Post—regarded Kamui's and Fūma's relationship as one of the best parts of the anime, stating while the rest of the cast is still likeable, few might make the audience miss the main conflict of the two characters. Beveridge later praised Kamui's and Fūma's final fight in the television series because it has its "own level of epic sadness and tragedy". In CLAMP in Context: A Critical Study of the Manga and Anime, Dani Cavallaro analyzed the handling of Fuma's and Kamui's actions. While both take similar paths in their fights in the war between the Dragons, Fuma takes his weapon using brute force while Kamui is granted his by his family. Fūma's action were noted to be portrayed with sadism, making him a major foil to Kamui's character. In their final battle of the film, although Fuma is defeated, there is no satisfaction for Kamui, who still cared for his friend in a similar fashion to the ending of RG Veda, Clamp's first manga. Several fans reading the series have wondered whether Clamp was hinting at a romantic relationship between Kamui and Fūma. In the book Understanding Manga and Anime writer Robin E. Brenner stated Clamp had none of those intentions, and compared them with the more explicit relationship between Subaru and Seishirō.

Kamui's appearance in Tsubasa: Reservoir Chronicle was popular and he was voted the sixth most-popular character in the second poll. Anime News Network criticized the handling of the X characters as simple fanservice  because while he originally faces Syaoran and Kurogane, the plot abandons this fight and moves to one between Kamui and Fūma. Sakura Eries of Mania Entertainment said despite his strength, Kamui was easily defeated by Syaoran, who continuously fights different enemies in the same arc regardless of wounds. Eries from the Fandom Post said the use of Kamui and Subaru as vampires was well-executed because through their aid, Fai D. Flowright survives his blood loss after Syaoran takes his eye, becoming a vampire to survive. Like other critics, the writer wondered when Clamp would explore his past. Beveridge noted Kamui shares multiple similarities with Syaoran based on their characterizations and objectives.

References

Anime and manga characters who can move at superhuman speeds
Anime and manga characters who use magic
Anime and manga characters with accelerated healing
Anime and manga characters with superhuman strength
Clamp characters
Comics characters introduced in 1992
Christ figures in fiction
Fictional characters with dimensional travel abilities
Fictional characters with extrasensory perception
Fictional characters with precognition
Fictional characters with slowed ageing
Fictional fencers
Fictional Japanese people in anime and manga
Fictional suicides
Fictional swordfighters in anime and manga
Fictional telekinetics
Fictional vampires
Male characters in anime and manga
Orphan characters in anime and manga
Teenage characters in anime and manga
Tsubasa: Reservoir Chronicle
X/1999